The Catholic University of South Sudan (abbreviated as CUofSS for short) is a university located in South Sudan. CUofSS consists of two campuses; one in the capital of Juba, while the other is located in the city of Wau. The university is fairly new as it was established and operating since 2008. However, the university was founded approximately three years before the independence of South Sudan.

History
In July 2007, five bishops from Sudan decided to establish a Catholic university that would have campuses and institutions in both northern and southern Sudan. The Catholic University of South Sudan opened with 50 pioneer students on 29 September 2008, as a private institution of higher education. In its first year of operation of the 2008–2009 academic year, the school enrolled 250 students, which is reported to be a high number for a country like that. The Jesuit Father Michael Schultheis served as its first vice-chancellor (2008–2013), followed by Dr fr. Matthew Pagan Daniel. In 2013, the campus in Wau started a project establishing new areas of study, including mineralogy and mining studies. The campus fully instituted these by 2014.

Location and faculties
The university's main campus is located in the city of Juba, Jubek State, in the southern region of South Sudan. The city of Juba is the capital of South Sudan and is the largest city in the country. The Faculty of Arts and Social Sciences is located in Juba. However, the Faculties of Agricultural and Environmental Sciences and Engineering is based in the city of Wau. The second campus in Wau also offers mining and mineralogy studies, implemented by 2014.

School description
The school has a container library, which was donated to the school in 2009.

References

See also
 Education in South Sudan
 List of universities in South Sudan

2008 establishments in South Sudan
Educational institutions established in 2008
Catholic universities and colleges in South Sudan
Buildings and structures in Juba
Central Equatoria
Equatoria